Charles Frith (28 May 1868 – 28 August 1942) was an English professional footballer who played as a wing half.

References

1868 births
1942 deaths
Footballers from Grimsby
English footballers
Association football wing halves
Humber Rovers F.C. players
Grimsby Town F.C. players
Fleetwood Rangers F.C. players
English Football League players